Paul Revere Mall is a corridor in Boston's North End, in the U.S. state of Massachusetts.

Description and history
The mall features an equestrian statue of Paul Revere. Additionally, there are 13 plaques commemorating various Boston residents, mounted along the Prado's brick walls. The plaques were surveyed by the Smithsonian Institution's "Save Outdoor Sculpture!" program in 1993.

References

External links

 

North End, Boston
Paul Revere